Jorge Molina Enríquez (born 1966 in Palma Soriano in the province of Santiago) is a Cuban actor and film director. After studying cinema in the USSR, he graduated from the Escuela Internacional de Cine y Television (International Film and TV School of San Antonio de los Baños, Cuba), known as EICTV. His thesis film, Molina's Culpa was a controversial tale with anti-Catholic content. He is a member of the communist party

Career
As an actor, Molina has appeared in close to 80 films (including student films and shorts), most notably in Cuban filmmaker Fernando Perez's films Madagascar, La vida es silbar and Madrigal. He recently he played one of the leading characters in the international hit Juan de los Muertos. His own works are always irreverent and provocative low budget productions, featuring plenty of sexual activity and violence. 

In 2008 Jorge Molina won funds from CINERGIA (Fund for the Promotion of the Audiovisual in Central America and the Caribbean). The jury granted Molina with $10.000 for producing his shortfilm Molina's Ferrozz, based on Charles Perraul's fairytale "Little Red Riding Hood". When he received the funds, Panamanian writer and frequent collaborator Edgar Soberón Torchia suggested he could extend the script, Molina agreed and he finally directed his first feature film, which was exhibited during the annual film festival in Havana. In 2018 he released ''Molina's Margarita'.

Molina was the cultural liaison at the EICTV, and also teaches directing at the Instituto Superior de Arte in Havana. He lives in San Antonio de los Banos with his wife and their two daughters.

External links

1966 births
Living people
People from Palma Soriano
Cuban film directors
Cuban male film actors
Academic staff of the Instituto Superior de Arte